Nayalgué may refer to:

Nayalgué, Bazèga, Burkina Faso
Nayalgué, Boulkiemdé, Burkina Faso